Beginning in 2002, Efraim Zuroff of the Simon Wiesenthal Center produced an Annual Status Report on the Worldwide Investigation and Prosecution of Nazi war criminals which, since at least 2004, has included a list of "most-wanted" criminals who had never been convicted. The list was last updated in 2018.

2018 list 
The following Nazi war criminals were facing possible prosecution , according to the 2018 list of the Simon Wiesenthal Center. Those marked in yellow are believed to be still alive.

Previously listed

References

Nazi war criminals
Nazi
Nazi
Simon Wiesenthal Center
Germany crime-related lists
Nazi-related lists
Lists of 21st-century people
Lists of criminals